Ato Sekyi-Otu is a Ghanaian political philosopher. He was born at Saltpond, Ghana in 1941 and until 1971 was known as Daniel Sackey Walker. He was educated at Mfantsipim School, Cape Coast, where he was Head Prefect in 1960-61 and completed his Cambridge Higher School Certificate in 1961 with distinctions in Greek and Latin. He went to Harvard and received an A.B. in Government in 1966. He pursued graduate studies at the University of Toronto where he worked with the renowned Canadian political theorist C.B. Macpherson and received his PhD in 1971. 

Sekyi-Otu taught in the Department of Social Science and the Graduate Program in Social and Political Thought at York University, Toronto until he retired in 2006 as Emeritus Professor. He is best known for his work on Frantz Fanon and Ayi Kwei Armah. In 1996 he wrote an acknowledged classic in the literature on Fanon entitled "Fanon's Dialectic of Experience" published by Harvard University Press. His most recent book is "Left Universalism, Africacentric Essays published by Routledge in 2018, which won the 2019 Caribbean Philosophical Association Frantz Fanon Outstanding Book Award.

Sekyi-Otu's work has been widely taken up in South Africa and in the Caribbean.

Published works
Fanon's Dialectic of Experience (Cambridge, MA: Harvard University Press, 1996)
Left Universalism, Africacentric Essays (Routledge, 2018)

Online articles by Ato Sekyi-Otu
Fanon and the Possibility of Post-Colonial Critical Imagination, 2003

References

Year of birth missing (living people)
Living people
Ghanaian philosophers
Ghanaian academics
Ghanaian writers
Fanon scholars
Marxist humanists
Marxist writers
Scholars of Marxism
Academic staff of York University
University of Toronto alumni
Harvard College alumni
People from Central Region (Ghana)